The Jamaican greater funnel-eared bat (Natalus jamaicensis) is a species of funnel-eared bat found in Jamaica. It was first described as the subspecies Natalus major jamaicensis, later as a subspecies of Natalus stramineus, and more recently as its own species. It is of a similar appearance to many species of the genus Natalus. It lives solely in St. Clair Cave in Jamaica and feeds on insects.

Taxonomy
Natalus was first reported as existing in Jamaica in 1951 by Koopman and Williams based on a partial mandible collected by H. E.
Anthony during 1919–1920. They referred to the species as N. Major. When a live specimen was encountered for the first time in 1959, it was described scientifically by George Gilbert Goodwin as Natulus major jamaicensis. The type was the skin and skull of a male collected from St. Clair Cave, St. Catherine Parish, Jamaica by C.B. Lewis on March 5, 1954.

Description
Goodwin described N. major jamaicanis as being distinguishable from the "typical" N. major by its "higher, shorter, and more globular braincase, more slender, longer, and flatter rostrum, the sides of which are concave instead of inflated and convex as in major, and by the noticeably narrower inter-orbital space". They are buffy in color.

Distribution and habitat
The Jamaican greater funnel-eared bat is only found in St. Clair Cave in Jamaica.

Conservation status
The IUCN has categorized the species as Critically Endangered because "its extent of occurrence is less than 100 km², all individuals are in a single location, and there is continuing decline in the extent and quality of its habitat". There is also a population of feral cats that live in the cave where these bats are found, likely feeding on bats.
In 2013, Bat Conservation International listed this species as one of the 35 species on its worldwide priority list for conservation.

References

Cited texts

Bats of the Caribbean
Endemic fauna of Jamaica
Mammals of Jamaica
Bat, Jamaican greater funnel-eared
Mammals described in 1959